Mena is a city in Polk County, Arkansas, United States. It is also the county seat of Polk County. The population was 5,558 as of the 2020 census. Mena is included in the Ark-La-Tex socio-economic region. Surrounded by the Ouachita National Forest, Mena is a gateway to some of the most visited tourist attractions in Arkansas.

History

Mena was founded by Arthur Edward Stilwell during the building of the Kansas City, Pittsburg and Gulf Railroad (now the Kansas City Southern), which stretched from Kansas City, Missouri to Port Arthur, Texas.  Train service to Mena began in 1896.

Stilwell named the town in honor of Folmina Margaretha Janssen-De Goeijen, the wife of his friend and financier Jan De Goeijen, whom Mr. De Goeijen affectionately called Mena. Janssen Park in the center of Mena is also named for her.

Mena was settled in 1896 and incorporated on September 18 of that year. In 1897, the Bank of Mena was founded.  The following year, the county seat was moved from nearby Dallas to Mena. Mena's population had grown to 3,423 by 1900. The main industries of the area were timber, agriculture and mineral extraction, though it was advertised as a spa city located within a healthy environment. Stilwell donated land to the city in 1906, and a park and campground were constructed. In 1910, the railroad moved its shop facilities from Mena to Heavener, Oklahoma. This created a loss of eight hundred jobs. A private school in Mena, Hendrix Academy, closed in 1905.

There were attempts to intimidate early Black settlers into leaving between 1896 and 1898. In 1901, an African-American man accused of kicking a White girl, was removed from the jail, beaten, and hanged. Local citizens posted a reward for the murderers; there were no arrests. In the mid-1920s, the town advertised that it had no Negroes. In the early 1900s, the Black population declined, and Mena became known as a Sundown town. In 1920, the Mena Star advertised the city as 100 percent White. In 1937, there were no Blacks in Mena.

In 1911, a damaging tornado struck the town.

Recent history
In the 1950s, a government program to stockpile manganese led to the reopening of local mines closed since the 1890s.  The program ended in 1959, and the mines again closed.

During the 1980s, drug smuggler Barry Seal moved his operations to the Mena Intermountain Municipal Airport, where he owned and operated many planes and helicopters, as well as advanced radar equipment. Seal also flew gun and drug smuggling missions between Mena and Nicaragua as part of a CIA scheme to support the Contras. Local law enforcement claimed that attempts to investigate the operation were blocked by the White House.

On April 9, 2009, a large and violent tornado devastated the town, killing three and injuring thirty. Many homes and businesses were damaged or destroyed. The Arkansas National Guard was deployed to the affected area.  The tornado was rated as a high-end EF3, with winds near , and damages estimated at $25 million.

Some of the businesses in the community are working to create a Downtown Arts District in Mena, anchored by the Mena Art Gallery at 607 Mena Street.  The gallery is a non-profit organization which exhibits about 12 shows a year ranging from invitational to open shows featuring primarily local artists in a variety of media. There is also an annual Children's Exhibit and a High School Exhibit.

Geography

Climate
Mena's climate is characterized by hot, humid summers and generally mild to cool winters, with precipitation occurring in all seasons.  The Köppen Climate Classification subtype for this climate is "Cfa" (Humid Subtropical Climate).

Demographics

2020 census

As of the 2020 United States census, there were 5,589 people, 2,341 households, and 1,420 families residing in the city.

2000 census
As of the census of 2000, there were 5,637 people, 2,431 households, and 1,546 families residing in the city. The racial makeup of the city was 96.91% White, 0.20% Black or African American, 0.87% Native American, 0.27% Asian, 0.05% Pacific Islander, 0.50% from other races, and 1.21% from two or more races. About 2.18% of the population were Hispanic or Latino of any race.

There were 2,431 households, out of which 27.5% had children under the age of 18 living with them, 49.7% were married couples living together, 10.9% had a female householder with no husband present, and 36.4% were non-families. Of all households 33.7% were made up of individuals, and 18.9% had someone living alone who was 65 years of age or older. The average household size was 2.24, and the average family size was 2.85.

In the city, the population was spread out, with 23.1% under the age of 18, 7.7% from 18 to 24, 23.8% from 25 to 44, 20.9% from 45 to 64, and 24.5% who were 65 years of age or older. The median age was 41 years. For every 100 females, there were 84.1 males. For every 100 females, age 18 and over, there were 79.9 males.

The median income for a household in the city was $22,671, and the median income for a family was $30,164. Males had a median income of $23,665 versus $18,472 for females. The per capita income for the city was $14,710. About 12.1% of families and 17.6% of the population were below the poverty line, including 22.8% of those under age 18 and 16.8% of those age 65 or over.

Media
The local newspaper is the weekly The Mena Star. The Southwest Times Record, based in Fort Smith, is also sold in Mena and covers both the news of the state and the Arkansas River Valley. A statewide daily, the Arkansas Democrat-Gazette, based in Little Rock, is distributed there too.

The big four television stations in Mena are KFSM (CBS), KHBS (ABC), KNWA (NBC) and KFTA (Fox). KARK (NBC, Little Rock) is also available on cable, dating from the times when KNWA's signal did not reach Mena. KNWA is available over-the-air via a digital sub-channel and on satellite.

KXI97 (sometimes referred to as Mena All Hazards) is a NOAA Weather Radio station that serves Mena.

Mena now has a tabloid circular, The Polk County Pulse, owned by KENA Radio.  This is distributed free of charge in Mena, coming out each Wednesday.

A monthly historical journal is also published in Mena, "Looking Glass Ouachita Magazine"  The monthly is distributed digitally as well as via special editions at local gift shops and restaurants.

Education

Elementary and secondary education 
Public education for elementary and secondary school students is available from two school districts:

 Mena School District, which includes Mena High School.
 Ouachita River School District, which includes Acorn High School in Acorn; it was recognized as a 2012 U.S. Department of Education Green Ribbon School.
Previously that section of Mena was in the Acorn School District. The Ouachita River School District was established by the merger of the Acorn School District and the Oden School District on July 1, 2004.

Post-secondary education 
 Commonwealth College was once located at the base of Rich Mountain and was known for its ties to socialism, as well as for being the one-time college of Orval Faubus, former Governor of Arkansas.
 Rich Mountain Community College is located in Mena.  In 2015, RMCC was accepted into the University of Arkansas network.  The two year post secondary institution is now known as UA Rich Mountain.

Infrastructure

Transportation 
 The city is served by Mena Intermountain Municipal Airport.

Utilities
 Rich Mountain Electric Cooperative is a non-profit rural electric utility cooperative headquartered in Mena.
 Within the city limits, electricity is provided by the Southwestern Electric Power Company (SWEPCO).

Health care
 The city is served by Mena Regional Health System.

Notable people 

 Barry Seal, pilot, businessman and drug smuggler
 Nate Bell, former member of Arkansas House of Representatives.
 Edwin L. Cox, businessman and philanthropist.
 Norris "Tuffy" Goff, comedian and radio actor, who played Abner Peabody in the famed Lum and Abner radio and television programs (born in Cove, Arkansas, raised in Mena).
 Chester Lauck, second half of the Lum and Abner comedy pair. Lauck played Columbus "Lum" Edwards.
 Herbert A. Littleton, awarded a Medal of Honor for his actions during the Korean War.
 Jim Mabry, former Arkansas Razorbacks football All-American (raised in Memphis, Tennessee), has spent most of his adult life in Mena.
 Dennis L. Montgomery, software designer who sold millions of dollars of useless software to the US Government.
 Marcus Richmond, Republican member of the Arkansas House of Representatives for District 21 in multi-county region; born in Mena in 1956.
 Mike Simpson, NFL player
 Dorothy Shaver, first female president of a major Fifth Avenue store.
 Olin E. Teague, longtime Texas's 6th congressional district representative who was born in Oklahoma, but reared in Mena.
 T. Texas Tyler, country singer ("The Deck of Cards").

References

External links
 

 

Cities in Arkansas
Cities in Polk County, Arkansas
County seats in Arkansas
1896 establishments in Arkansas
Populated places established in 1896
Sundown towns in Arkansas